The 2002 California lieutenant gubernatorial election occurred on November 5, 2002. The primary elections took place on March 5, 2002. The Democratic incumbent, Cruz Bustamante, defeated the Republican nominee, State Senator Bruce McPherson.

Primary results
A bar graph of statewide results in this contest are available at https://web.archive.org/web/20080905210433/http://primary2002.ss.ca.gov/Returns/ltg/00.htm.

Results by county are available at https://web.archive.org/web/20080905210433/http://primary2002.ss.ca.gov/Returns/ltg/00.htm#cty.

Democratic

Republican

Others

General election results
Final results from the Secretary of State of California:

Results by county
Results from the Secretary of State of California:

See also
California state elections, 2002
State of California
Lieutenant Governor of California
List of Lieutenant Governors of California

External links
VoteCircle.com Non-partisan resources & vote sharing network for Californians
Information on the elections from California's Secretary of State 
Official Homepage of the Lieutenant Governor of California

2002 California elections
California
2002